Michael Alan Young is a businessman with a political background.  He secretly organised the meetings between the South African government and the leadership of the African National Congress (ANC).

Career
After graduating from the University of York in PPE in 1972, Young started his career in 10 Downing Street, the Prime Minister's office and in the Foreign Office when Edward Heath was Prime Minister. He moved to ARC Ltd and then to its parent Consolidated Gold Fields as Public Affairs Manager where he worked under the Chairman Rudolph Agnew. It was under Agnew that Young organised secret meetings at Mells Park House, a building designed by Edwin Lutyens in Somerset.  The meetings were attended by various delegates from the South African government as well as leaders of the ANC such as Thabo Mbeki and Oliver Tambo. The meetings contributed to the end of South Africa's apartheid regime. In 2001 he was appointed OBE for his contribution to human rights.

Young later joined the Liberal Party, standing as the party's candidate for Penrith and The Border at the 1983 General Election, where he came second, and in the same seat in a by-election seven weeks later, when he came within 552 votes of gaining the seat from the Conservatives. He also stood as the Liberal candidate in the 1987 General Election for the Isle of Wight, again coming second.

In 2009 Michael Young was the subject of a Film called Endgame produced by Channel 4, a national Television Network in the United Kingdom.

See also
 Endgame (2009 film)

References

Further reading
 Robert Harvey, The Fall of Apartheid, Houndmills, Basingstoke, Hampshire ; New York : Palgrave, 2001.

External links
 Michael Young and the end of apartheid in South Africa, audio of interview, 27 March 2012
 Endgame, PBS Masterpiece Contemporary, additional interviews and resources

Year of birth missing (living people)
Living people
British businesspeople
Alumni of the University of York